The black-headed tanager (Stilpnia cyanoptera) is a species of bird in the family Thraupidae.
It is found in the northern highlands of South America (Andes of northeastern Colombia, Venezuelan Coastal Range and tepuis of southern Venezuela).
Its natural habitats are subtropical or tropical moist montane forests, subtropical or tropical high-altitude shrubland, and heavily degraded former forest.

References

black-headed tanager
Birds of the Sierra Nevada de Santa Marta
Birds of the Venezuelan Coastal Range
Birds of Venezuela
black-headed tanager
Taxonomy articles created by Polbot
Taxobox binomials not recognized by IUCN
Birds of the Tepuis